The following is a bibliography of works by Jacques Derrida.

The precise chronology of Derrida's work is difficult to establish, as many of his books are not monographs but collections of essays that had been printed previously. Virtually all of his works were delivered in slightly different form as lectures and revised for publication. Some of his work was first collected in English, and additional content has been added to some collection with the appearance of English translations or later French editions.

Monographs and collections

* referenced in the Derrida entry.

** the English edition collects an alternate translation of the essay "Signature, Event, Context", which already appeared in Margins of Philosophy, with "Limited Inc., abc" and "Afterword: Toward an Ethics of Discussion," which had not been previously collected in any language. The latter essays were collected first in English, partially because the last of the two was written in response to a questions put in a letter from Gerald Graff.

*** the English edition collects previous and original translations, some of which are excerpts of larger works; the French subsequent edition is expanded, containing additional essays which appeared in the interim.

Selected translations of works by Derrida
 "Speech and Phenomena" and Other Essays on Husserl's Theory of Signs, trans. David B. Allison (Evanston: Northwestern University Press, 1973).
 Of Grammatology, trans. Gayatri Chakravorty Spivak (Baltimore & London: Johns Hopkins University Press, 1976) (hardcover: , paperback: ,).
 Writing and Difference, trans. Alan Bass (Chicago: University of Chicago Press, 1978) .
 Spurs: Nietzsche's Styles, trans. Barbara Harlow (Chicago & London: University of Chicago Press, 1979).
 The Archeology of the Frivolous: Reading Condillac, trans. John P. Leavey Jr. (Lincoln & London: University of Nebraska Press, 1980).
 Dissemination, trans. Barbara Johnson (Chicago: University of Chicago Press, 1981).
 Positions, trans. Alan Bass (Chicago: University of Chicago Press, 1981) [Paris, Minuit, 1972].
 Margins of Philosophy, trans. Alan Bass (Chicago: Chicago University Press, 1982).
 Signsponge, trans. Richard Rand (New York: Columbia University Press, 1984).
 The Ear of the Other, trans. Peggy Kamuf (Lincoln & London: University of Nebraska Press, 1985).
 Glas, trans. John P. Leavey, Jr. & Richard Rand (Lincoln & London: University of Nebraska Press, 1986).
 Memoires for Paul de Man (New York: Columbia University Press, 1986; revised edn., 1989).
 The Post Card: From Socrates to Freud and Beyond, trans. Alan Bass (Chicago & London: University of Chicago Press, 1987).
 The Truth in Painting, trans. Geoffrey Bennington & Ian McLeod (Chicago & London: Chicago University Press, 1987).
 Limited Inc (Evanston: Northwestern University Press, 1988).
 Edmund Husserl's Origin of Geometry: An Introduction, trans. John P. Leavey, Jr. (Lincoln & London: University of Nebraska Press, 1989).
 Of Spirit: Heidegger and the Question, trans. Geoffrey Bennington & Rachel Bowlby (Chicago & London: University of Chicago Press, 1989).
 Cinders (book)|Cinders, trans. Ned Lukacher (Lincoln & London: University of Nebraska Press, 1991).
 Acts of Literature (New York & London: Routledge, 1992).
 Given Time|Given Time: I. Counterfeit Money, trans. Peggy Kamuf (Chicago & London: University of Chicago Press, 1992).
 The Other Heading|The Other Heading: Reflections on Today's Europe, trans. Pascale-Anne Brault & Michael B. Naas (Bloomington & Indianapolis: Indiana University Press, 1992).
 Aporias, trans. Thomas Dutoit (Stanford: Stanford University Press, 1993).
 Jacques Derrida (book)|Jacques Derrida, co-author & trans. Geoffrey Bennington (Chicago & London: Chicago University Press, 1993).
 Memoirs of the Blind|Memoirs of the Blind: The Self-Portrait and Other Ruins, trans. Pascale-Anne Brault & Michael Naas (Chicago & London: University of Chicago Press, 1993).
 Specters of Marx: The State of the Debt, the Work of Mourning, and the New International, trans. Peggy Kamuf (New York & London: Routledge, 1994).
 Archive Fever: A Freudian Impression, trans. Eric Prenowitz (Chicago & London: University of Chicago Press, 1995).
 The Gift of Death, trans. David Wills (Chicago & London: University of Chicago Press, 1995).
 On the Name, trans. David Wood, John P. Leavey, Jr., & Ian McLeod (Stanford: Stanford University Press, 1995).
 Points...: Interviews 1974-1994, trans. Peggy Kamuf and others, (Stanford: Stanford University Press, 1995) (see also the footnote about ) (see also the [1992] French Version Points de suspension: entretiens).
 Chora L Works, with Peter Eisenman (New York: Monacelli, 1997).
 Politics of Friendship, trans. George Collins (London & New York: Verso, 1997).
 Monolingualism of the Other; or, The Prosthesis of Origin, trans. Patrick Mensah (Stanford: Stanford University Press, 1998).
 Resistances of Psychoanalysis, trans. Peggy Kamuf, Pascale-Anne Brault and Michael Naas (Stanford: Stanford University Press, 1998).
 The Secret Art of Antonin Artaud, with Paule Thévenin, trans. Mary Ann Caws (Cambridge, Mass., & London: MIT Press, 1998).
 Adieu: To Emmanuel Levinas, trans. Pascale-Anne Brault & Michael Naas (Stanford: Stanford University Press, 1999).
 Rights of Inspection, trans. David Wills (New York: Monacelli, 1999).
 Demeure: Fiction and Testimony, with Maurice Blanchot, The Instant of My Death, trans. Elizabeth Rottenberg (Stanford: Stanford University Press, 2000).
 Of Hospitality, trans. Rachel Bowlby (Stanford: Stanford University Press, 2000).
 Deconstruction Engaged: The Sydney Seminars (Sydney: Power Publications, 2001).
 On Cosmopolitanism and Forgiveness, trans. Mark Dooley & Michael Hughes (London & New York: Routledge, 2001).
 A Taste for the Secret, with Maurizio Ferraris, trans. Giacomo Donis (Cambridge: Polity, 2001).
 The Work of Mourning, trans. Pascale-Anne Brault & Michael Naas (Chicago & London: Chicago University Press, 2001).
 Acts of Religion (New York & London: Routledge, 2002).
 Echographies of Television: Filmed Interviews, with Bernard Stiegler, trans. Jennifer Bajorek (Cambridge: Polity, 2002).
 Ethics, Institutions, and the Right to Philosophy, trans Peter Pericles Trifonas (Lanham: Rowman & Littlefield, 2002).
 Negotiations: Interventions and Interviews, 1971–2001, trans. Elizabeth Rottenberg (Stanford: Stanford University Press, 2002).
 Who's Afraid of Philosophy?: Right to Philosophy 1, trans. Jan Plug (Stanford: Stanford University Press, 2002).
 Without Alibi, trans. Peggy Kamuf (Stanford: Stanford University Press, 2002).
 Philosophy in a Time of Terror|Philosophy in a Time of Terror: Dialogues with Jürgen Habermas and Jacques Derrida, with Jürgen Habermas (Chicago & London: University of Chicago Press, 2003).
 The Problem of Genesis in Husserl's Philosophy, trans. Marian Hobson (Chicago & London: Chicago University Press, 2003).
 Counterpath, with Catherine Malabou, trans. David Wills (Stanford: Stanford University Press, 2004).
 Eyes of the University: Right to Philosophy 2, trans. Jan Plug (Stanford: Stanford University Press, 2004).
 For What Tomorrow...: A Dialogue, with Elisabeth Roudinesco, trans. Jeff Fort (Stanford: Stanford University Press, 2004).
 Rogues: Two Essays on Reason, trans. Pascale-Anne Brault & Michael Naas (Stanford: Stanford University Press, 2004).
 On Touching—Jean-Luc Nancy, trans. Christine Irizarry (Stanford: Stanford University Press, 2005).
 Paper Machine, trans. Rachel Bowlby (Stanford: Stanford University Press, 2005).
 Sovereignties in Question|Sovereignties in Question: The Poetics of Paul Celan, trans. Thomas Dutoit (New York: Fordham University Press, 2005).
 H. C. for Life: That Is to Say..., trans. Laurent Milesi & Stefan Herbrechter (Stanford: Stanford University Press, 2006).
 Geneses, Genealogies, Genres, and Genius|Geneses, Genealogies, Genres, And Genius: The Secrets of the Archive, trans. Beverly Bie Brahic (New York: Columbia University Press, 2006).
 Learning to Live Finally: The Last Interview, with Jean Birnbaum, trans. Pascale-Anne Brault & Michael Naas (Melville House, 2007).
 Psyche: Inventions of the Other, Volume I (Stanford: Stanford University Press, 2007).
 Psyche: Inventions of the Other, Volume II (Stanford: Stanford University Press, 2008).
 The Animal That Therefore I Am, trans. David Wills (New York: Fordham University Press, 2008).
 The Beast and the Sovereign, Volume I, trans. Geoffrey Bennington (Chicago: University of Chicago Press, 2009).
 Copy, Archive, Signature: A Conversation on Photography, ed. Gerhard Richter, trans. Jeff Fort (Stanford: Stanford University Press, 2010).
 Athens, Still Remains: The Photographs of Jean-François Bonhomme, trans. Michael Naas (New York: Fordham University Press, 2010).
 Parages, ed. John P. Leavey, trans. Tom Conley, James Hulbert, John P. Leavey, and Avital Ronell (Stanford: Stanford University Press, 2011).
 The Beast and the Sovereign, Volume II, trans. Geoffrey Bennington (Chicago: University of Chicago Press ).
 Signature Derrida, ed. Jay Williams (Chicago: University of Chicago Press ).
 The Death Penalty, Volume I (Chicago: University of Chicago Press, 2014).
 Heidegger: The Question of Being and History (Chicago: University of Chicago Press, 2016).
 Body of Prayer, co-authored with David Shapiro and Michal Govrin (New York: The Irwin S. Chanin School of Architecture, 2001).

References

Deconstruction
Bibliographies by writer
Bibliographies of French writers
Philosophy bibliographies